Betty S. Holzendorf is an American former politician from Florida. She served four years in the Florida House of Representatives and 10 years in the Florida Senate.

Life and career
Holzendorf graduated from Edward Waters College and the University of North Florida, both in Jacksonville.

In the 1960s she was an administrative aide to mayor Jake Godbold.

She married King Holzendorf who served as a city councilman in Jacksonville. One of their sons was convicted of mortgage fraud.

She was defeated in 2003 in a race for the Mayor of Jacksonville. The Jacksonville Daily Record interviewed her during her mayoral campaign.

Betty Holzendorf Drive In Jacksonville is named for her.

References

External links

Year of birth missing (living people)
Democratic Party Florida state senators
Democratic Party members of the Florida House of Representatives
African-American state legislators in Florida
Living people
Women state legislators in Florida
African-American women in politics
Edward Waters College alumni
University of North Florida alumni
20th-century American women politicians
20th-century American politicians
21st-century American women politicians
21st-century American politicians
20th-century African-American women
20th-century African-American politicians
21st-century African-American women
21st-century African-American politicians